Hamzah Tariq Jamil is a Pakistani theatre and television actor, and singer. Tariq has been appeared in several theatre plays and serials including Grease – The Musical, Meri Mishaal, Churails, Mere Baba Ki Ounchi Haveli, Meray Dost Meray Yaar. He is the first Pakistani artist to start Dude with a Sign through his social media. Filmography 

 Theatre Grease The Musical''

Television

Short film

Web

References 

Living people
Pakistani male stage actors
Year of birth missing (living people)
Pakistani male television actors
Pakistani male singers